Oliver James Dowden  (born 1 August 1978) is a British politician who has served as Chancellor of the Duchy of Lancaster since October 2022 and Secretary of State for the Cabinet Office since February 2023. He has been the Member of Parliament (MP) for Hertsmere since 2015.

Dowden served in the Johnson government as Minister for the Cabinet Office and Paymaster General from 2019 to 2020 and Secretary of State for Digital, Culture, Media and Sport from 2020 to 2021. He also served as Co-Chairman of the Conservative Party, alongside Ben Elliot, and Minister without Portfolio from 2021 to 2022.

Early life and career
Dowden was born on 1 August 1978. He grew up in Bricket Wood, Hertfordshire, being educated at Parmiter's School, a partially selective state comprehensive school in Garston, Watford.
He said he had an "excellent state education", before going to Trinity Hall, Cambridge, where he read law.

Dowden joined the Conservative Research Department in 2004, moving to PR company Hill & Knowlton in 2007, before returning to the Conservative Party in 2009.

He then worked as a special adviser and David Cameron's deputy chief of staff, where he said most of his time was spent on "day-to-day crisis management". Dowden was regarded as having expertise in the attacking form of political communications, leading to comparisons with Labour's Alastair Campbell.

Political career

Early parliamentary career
Dowden was elected MP for Hertsmere in the 2015 general election, with a majority of 18,461 votes. While standing, among the policy priorities he highlighted in his campaign were improving transport infrastructure, preserving green belt land and improving education. He made his maiden speech on 17 June 2015.

Dowden was appointed a Commander of the Order of the British Empire (CBE) in the 2015 Dissolution Honours List on 27 August 2015.

He opposed Brexit prior to the 2016 referendum, though he has subsequently supported it citing his "respect" for the verdict of the British people.

Dowden has campaigned in Hertfordshire against development of the local Green Belt, including opposing Welwyn Hatfield Borough Council's draft local plan.

Dowden is a former officer of the Conservative Friends of Israel, and has twice chaired the APPG for British Jews. Dowden has said he feels a "cultural affinity" with the Jewish community – his constituency of Hertsmere has the largest Jewish population outside of London.

Junior ministerial roles
In January 2018, Dowden was promoted to parliamentary secretary to the Cabinet Office, as part of Theresa May's cabinet reshuffle. In June 2019, during the 2019 Conservative Party leadership election Dowden, with Robert Jenrick and Rishi Sunak, all three junior ministers in Theresa May's government, wrote an article headlined "The Tories are in deep peril. Only Boris Johnson can save us" for The Times, endorsing former Foreign Secretary Boris Johnson for Prime Minister.

Appointed Minister for the Cabinet Office and Paymaster General by incoming Prime Minister Boris Johnson on 24 July 2019, Dowden was appointed a member of the Privy Council the next day.

As Minister for the Cabinet Office, Dowden led the government's plans to reform public procurement, after the liquidation of contractor Carillion in 2018.

Secretary of State for Digital, Culture, Media and Sport
On 13 February 2020, Dowden was appointed Secretary of State for Digital, Culture, Media and Sport, succeeding Baroness Morgan of Cotes, who resigned from the cabinet.

During the COVID-19 pandemic, Dowden introduced a £1.57 billion support package for the arts industry, which received praise from across the sector.

In July 2020 Dowden announced that equipment provided by Chinese telecommunications company Huawei would be removed from the UK's 5G network by 2027.

Dowden asked Netflix to add a "health warning" before episodes of the series The Crown, and warned against younger viewers taking fiction as fact. Netflix didn't make these changes until prior to the release of the series' fifth season.

In August 2021, Dowden announced new multi-billion pound data partnerships between the UK, Australia and the Republic of Korea, billed as an opportunity to reduce global barriers to international trade after Brexit. This presaged a series of reforms to the UK's data regime, with the aim of encouraging innovation and economic growth.

Dowden also intervened in the national debate over the so-called "cancellation" of controversial historical figures, advocating a "retain and explain" approach from museums and heritage institutions, which would be "moreist" rather than "Maoist". Dowden had previously said that "woke culture runs contrary to the great liberal traditions of Western democracies".

As the minister responsible for the UK's national collections Dowden opposed the return of historic artefacts held in British museums and galleries that had been brought to Britain during the colonial period. In particular he argued that the Benin bronzes, most of which had been taken by force by British armed forces from Benin City in what is now Nigeria during a punitive raid in February 1897, should remain in Britain. In an interview with Channel 4 News in September 2021 about the bronzes held in the British Museum, he said "The collections of our great national institutions have been developed over many, many centuries, in many times in questionable circumstances. I think the question now is about what we do with these. I love the Benin bronzes, I've seen them many times throughout my life, and I think them being in the British Museum, which is a world repository of heritage, allows people to see it but that doesn't stop us from sharing it."

In April 2021, Dowden led government opposition to the controversial European Super League proposals, describing the planned breakaway by six Premier League clubs as "appalling" and "tone-deaf".

Co-Chairman of the Conservative Party
On 15 September 2021, Johnson appointed Dowden as an unpaid Minister without Portfolio and Conservative Party Co-Chairman during a cabinet reshuffle. In a speech at party headquarters following his appointment, Dowden told Conservative staff to "prepare for the next election".

During his time as Co-Chairman, Dowden continued to be identified with the controversy over 'woke culture'. On 14 February 2022, Dowden gave a speech in the USA to The Heritage Foundation in which he criticised cancel culture, calling it a "painful woke psychodrama" which is sweeping the West and sapping its confidence, further saying that woke ideology is a "dangerous form of decadence". He had made similar remarks to the Conservative Party Conference in October 2021.

In April 2022 the Conservative Government announced a consultation on a measure that would give residents an automatic right to vote on proposals by their local council to change the name of the street in which they live. Street name changes would have to be put to a vote by residents and the result of that vote would have to be taken into account by the council. Dowden said in a press release quoted by the Daily Telegraph: "Labour and Liberal Democrat councils across the country are hiking council tax while squandering hard-earned local taxpayers’ money on these woke pet projects that nobody wants. These proposals will give local residents a democratic check against the lefty municipal militants trying to cancel war heroes like Churchill and Nelson." As at August 2022 the consultation had not yet been published.

On 24 June 2022, Dowden resigned as Co-Chairman of the Conservative Party and Minister without Portfolio following the Conservative defeats at the Tiverton and Honiton by-election and Wakefield by-election, saying: "We cannot carry on with business as usual" and "Somebody must take responsibility".

July 2022 Conservative Party leadership election
Dowden declared his support for former Chancellor of the Exchequer Rishi Sunak at the beginning of the leadership contest, before the first round of voting had begun and the day after Prime Minister Boris Johnson announced he would resign after a leadership election had taken place.

Chancellor of the Duchy of Lancaster and Secretary of State for the Cabinet Office
On 25 October 2022, Dowden was appointed Chancellor of the Duchy of Lancaster, replacing Nadhim Zahawi, and as Secretary of State for the Cabinet Office, a new position, on 9 February 2023.

Personal life
Dowden is married to Blythe, a teacher, and they have two children.

References

External links

Living people
1978 births
People from Hertfordshire
People from St Albans (district)
People educated at Parmiter's School, Garston
Alumni of Trinity Hall, Cambridge
British special advisers
Conservative Party (UK) MPs for English constituencies
UK MPs 2015–2017
UK MPs 2017–2019
UK MPs 2019–present
Commanders of the Order of the British Empire
Members of the Privy Council of the United Kingdom
Chancellors of the Duchy of Lancaster
United Kingdom Paymasters General